Roland Vieira (born 16 August 1979) is a French professional football manager and former player who is the manager of  club Le Puy. In his playing career, he was a striker. Clubs he played for include Angers, Sion, Libourne, Chamois Niortais, Gazélec Ajaccio, and Romorantin.

Honours

Player 
Chamois Niortais
 Championnat National: 2005–06

Manager 
Le Puy

 Championnat National 2: 2021–22

 Championnat de France Amateur 2: 2014–15

References

1979 births
Living people
Sportspeople from Mâcon
French footballers
Association football forwards
French football managers
Olympique Lyonnais players
Angers SCO players
FC Sion players
FC Libourne players
Chamois Niortais F.C. players
Gazélec Ajaccio players
SO Romorantin players
AS Moulins players
Andrézieux-Bouthéon FC players
Le Puy Foot 43 Auvergne players
Ligue 2 players
Championnat National players
Footballers from Bourgogne-Franche-Comté
French expatriate footballers
French expatriate sportspeople in Switzerland
Expatriate footballers in Switzerland

External links 

 
Roland Vieira profile at foot-national.com